The 1915 Glasgow Central by-election was held on 16 July 1915.  The by-election was held due to the incumbent Conservative MP, Charles Dickson, becoming the Lord Justice Clerk.  It was won by the Unionist candidate John MacLeod.

References

1915 in Scotland
1910s elections in Scotland
1915 elections in the United Kingdom
Central, 1915
1910s in Glasgow
July 1915 events